Eugene Amo-Dadzie (born 1992) is a British track and field athlete who competes as a sprinter. He was a bronze medalist over 60 metres at the 2023 British National Indoor Championships.

Career

Late starter
Amo-Dadzie didn’t start competing until he was twenty-six years-old, by which time he was a qualified chartered accountant. He competed at the British National Championships for the first time in 2019, finishing fifth in his semi-final.

A Woodford Green athlete, Amo-Dadzie ran a new personal best time over 100m of 10.20 seconds to finish second at the 2021 England national championships in Bedford. In August 2022 he lowered his personal best over 100m to 10.05 in Stratford. This placed him third over 100m by fastest time by UK athletes in 2022.

First British selection
In February 2023 he finished third behind Reece Prescod and Jeremiah Azu at the UK national indoor championships 60m race, held in Birmingham. They were subsequently selected for the Great Britain squad for the 2023 European Indoor Athletics Championships held at the Ataköy Athletics Arena in Istanbul. He qualified for the semi-finals of the 60m on his major championships debut.

Personal life
From Rainham, Amo-Dadzie said he felt a responsibility to speak out to encourage BAME people to have the conversation around taking the covid-19 vaccine in order to quell concerns they may have. Eugene is married with children.

References

External links

British male sprinters

People from the London Borough of Havering

People from Rainham, London

1992 births
Living people